WMJQ-CD, virtual channel 40 (UHF digital channel 27), is a low-power, Class A MeTV-affiliated television station licensed to Syracuse, New York, United States. The station is owned by Renard Communications, one of the numerous holding companies owned or co-owned by Craig Fox. WMJQ-CD's transmitter is located on the WOLF radio tower on West Kirkpatrick Street northwest of downtown Syracuse.

History
Originally licensed to serve DeWitt, New York, the station held the call sign WIXT-CA from 2005 to 2013, before changing to WIXT-CD. The WIXT call sign was used by the ABC affiliate in Syracuse from 1978 to 2005 (it is now WSYR-TV).

In October 2020, WIXT-CD assumed the MeTV affiliation from Nexstar's WSYR-TV (channel 9), which dropped the network in favor of co-owned Antenna TV. In January 2021, the call sign was changed to WMJQ-CD.

Subchannels
The station's digital signal is multiplexed:

References

External links
 MeTV official website

MeTV affiliates
Low-power television stations in the United States
Television channels and stations established in 1990
MJQ-CD
1990 establishments in New York (state)